Fast-moving consumer goods (FMCG), also known as consumer packaged goods (CPG), are products that are sold quickly and at a relatively low cost. Examples include non-durable household goods such as packaged foods, beverages, toiletries, candies, cosmetics, over-the-counter drugs, dry goods, and other consumables.

Fast moving consumer goods have a high inventory turnover and are contrasted with specialty items which have lower sales and higher carrying charges. Many retailers carry only FMCGs; particularly hypermarkets, big box stores and warehouse club stores. Small convenience stores also stock fast moving goods; the limited shelf space is filled with higher turnover items.

Characteristics 

The following are the main characteristics of FMCGs:

 From the consumer perspective
 Frequent purchases
 Low engagement (little or no effort to choose the item)
 Low prices
 Short shelf life 
 Rapid consumption

 From the marketer perspective
 High volumes
 Low contribution margins
 Extensive distribution 
 High inventory turnover

Consumer Packaged Goods Companies 
The following are well known Consumer Packaged Goods (CPG) manufacturing companies

 Nestlé
 Procter & Gamble
 PepsiCo
 Unilever
 AB InBev
 L’Oréal
 Coca-Cola
 Mondelez International
 Kraft Heinz
 Heineken
 Kellogg's

Rural consumers 
Consumers in rural areas typically purchase goods from nearby towns and villages. Recently, there has been a shift in consumer purchase behavior toward purchasing locally that has prompted the need for better local promotional efforts to generate brand awareness in small towns. FMCGs play a large part in the economy, as they are inelastic products that touch every part of consumer life. Businesses that supply FMCGs to a rural community can help provide employment opportunities and drive down the cost of such products in those rural areas. For instance, FMCGs represent the fourth-largest sector in the Indian economy and generate employment for more than three million people in downstream activities.

ISIC definition 

The retail market for FMCGs includes businesses in the following International Standard Industrial Classification (ISIC) (Revision 3) categories:

Supplier industries for FMCGs include:

Fast-moving consumer electronics 

Fast-moving consumer electronics are typically low-priced generic items with many comparable alternatives offering similar functionality. Examples of consumer electronics include mobile phones, MP3 players, game players, earphones, headphones, OTG cables and digital disposable cameras.

See also 
 Category management
 Mass production
 Trade promotion management
 Shelf-ready packaging

References 

Manufactured goods
Retail packaging
de:Warenrotation#Schnelldreher